Stadthalle is an indoor sporting arena located in Klagenfurt, Austria. The arena was built in 1959 and has a current capacity of 4,945. For the majority of its history the arena held around 5,500 people, however, due to small changes in recent years it has been continually reduced.  It is currently home to the EC KAC ice hockey team

References

Indoor ice hockey venues in Austria
Sports venues in Carinthia (state)
Sport in Klagenfurt
1959 establishments in Austria
Sports venues completed in 1959
20th-century architecture in Austria